Dungeon (French title: Donjon) is a series of comic fantasy comic books created by Joann Sfar and Lewis Trondheim, with contributions from numerous other artists. It was originally published in France by Delcourt as a series of graphic albums; English translations of a large amount of stories have been released by NBM Publishing, first in a black-and-white periodical version and now as several color graphic novels.

The series is a parody of sword and sorcery conventions in general, and specifically of the role-playing game Dungeons and Dragons. All of the characters are either anthropomorphic animals or other strange creatures. The "dungeon" of the title is, in the original series, a business establishment run by a mild-mannered chicken, where heroes come in search of adventure and treasure and invariably die. The timeline in the main continuity is described as the stages of day; the series that lead up to the dungeon's creation are described in the Potron-Minet (dawn) segment, the castle's glory days are described as its Zénith (zenith), and its inevitable decay is described in the Crépuscule (twilight) stories.

Sub-series

Dungeon is an extremely ambitious work consisting of several sub-series and various side projects. The Zenith books begin at number 1, while Early Years begins at -99 and Twilight at 101, implying that the authors intended to produce an unprecedented number of books.

Early Years 
Dungeon Early Years (Donjon Potron-Minet, literally Dawn) describes the events leading up to the creation of the titular dungeon, with art by Christophe Blain, Christophe Gaultier and Stéphane Oiry.

Zenith 
Dungeon Zenith (Donjon Zénith) portrays the golden age of the world of Terra Amata . The first four books are drawn by Lewis Trondheim, and from book five onwards by Boulet.

Twilight 
Dungeon Twilight (Donjon Crépuscule) is a darker series where Herbert the Duck has become the dark overlord of the Dungeon, known as The Great Khan. Marvin the dragon, old and blind, teams with Marvin the Red, a brash rabbit warrior.  The first three volumes are drawn by Joann Sfar, the others by various artists.

Parade 
Dungeon Parade takes place between volumes 1 and 2 of Dungeon Zenith, starring its protagonists Marvin and Herbert. The artists are Manu Larcenet then Alexis Nesme.

Monstres 
Dungeon Monstres (Donjon Monsters) features secondary characters from throughout the story. Stories can be set anywhere in the timeline, and feature occasional appearances by the major characters. There is a wide variety of artists in the numerous volumes of this sub-series.

Antipodes 
Two additional series (Donjon Antipodes − and Donjon Antipodes +) explore the distant past and the far future of the other series.

Bonus 
A last sub-series called Donjon Bonus hosts works outside the comics, like the tabletop role-playing game Clefs en Mains

Bibliography 

Since the series start, it has grown into quite a large collection of volumes. The place of each book in an orderly timeline is worked out using “levels”. The volume number of books in the main series (Early Years, Zenith, Twilight, Antipodes) is also their level. The Monstres and Parade level numbers are written down in the original books on the first page below the page number.

The following table shows all the French volumes by Delcourt and information about English-language releases by NBM Publishing. The table can be sorted by series, or by chronological order using “levels”. Unless otherwise noted, all the books are written by Lewis Trondheim and Joann Sfar, with various artists.

Main characters 
Herbert the Duck is the "hero" of the story, and appears in at least Donjon Zenith and Crepuscule series. As his name suggests, he is a duck, although he has a humanoid body, and is covered in feathers. He is the possessor of the Sword of Destiny (a parody of other mystical weapons in adventure books). This sword is unique in that it can talk, and that has many mystical powers, such as being able to glow in the dark, being able to summon former bearers when someone other than its legitimate user tries to hold it, and not allowing the use of any other weapon by its owner. Also, one side of its blade has the enigmatic property of being able to cut -and even behead- living beings without killing them.
Marvin the Dragon serves as the reluctant instructor and protector of Herbert the Duck. Marvin is a fierce warrior who loves a good fight, but at the same time he is bound by the principles of his religion. He is a strict vegetarian, refuses to eat "human" or animal flesh and will not attack anyone who has insulted him.  Like other dragons, he can breathe fire, but will do so only when strictly necessary. Initially caused by indigestion due to eating little blue mushrooms, Marvin is capable of producing a "Tong Deum", a large blast of fire-breath. He looks vaguely humanoid, with huge muscles and scarlet skin. Marvin is loyal to his boss, the Keeper - though not entirely averse to keeping him in the dark about certain matters.
Hyacinthe de Cavallere (aka the Dungeon Master or "the Keeper") is a greedy, yet lovable, capitalist who only cares about enriching himself by attracting adventurers and treasure-seekers to his Dungeon, where they will leave their corpses and possessions. In his youth, Hyacinthe was actually quite idealistic, and disguised himself as the nocturnal crime fighter "the Night Shirt". The Dungeon's core is the ancestral keep of the de Cavellere family, though greatly enlarged during Hyacinthe's lifetime.
Marvin the Red, the hero of the Crepuscule/Twilight series.  He is a tall, thin rabbit, colored bright red.  He is a young warrior and very impetuous.

Notes

References

External links
 Dungeon page at NBM Publishing

1998 comics debuts